Mark or Marc El(l)iot(t) may refer to:

Marc Eliot (Doctors), a character in the British soap opera Doctors
Marc Elliot (born 1986), American author 
Marc Elliott (born 1979), British actor
Mark Elliot (radio host) (1953–2019), Canadian broadcaster
Mark Elliott (voice-over artist) (1939–2021), American voice-over artist for the Walt Disney Company
Mark Elliott (boxer) (born 1966), British boxer
Mark Elliott (British author) (born 1963), British travel author
Mark Elliott (historian), American professor of Chinese and Asian history at Harvard University
Mark Elliott (Love Is a Many Splendored Thing), a character in the American soap opera Love is a Many Splendored Thing
Mark Elliott (musician) (born 1967), American country singer and songwriter
Mark Elliott (footballer) (born 1959), Welsh footballer
Mark W. Elliott (active from 2007), scholar of religion at the University of St Andrews
Paul Mark Elliott, British actor
Marc Eliot, British historian and author of Walt Disney: Hollywood's Dark Prince